Harvey S. Leff is a United States physicist and physics teacher who is known primarily for his research and expository articles in physics, focusing on energy, entropy, Maxwell's demon, and the foundations of thermodynamics. He introduced the 'energy spreading' metaphor for entropy change.

Career
Leff was a faculty member at the Case Institute of Technology and Case Western Reserve University, Chicago State University, Harvey Mudd College and was a scientist and energy policy analyst at the Institute for Energy Analysis at Oak Ridge Associated Universities. For most of his career, he was professor at California State Polytechnic University-Pomona. In 2010, he became a visiting scholar at Reed College.

Publications
Leff is author of a monograph on energy and entropy, co-edited two editions of a book on Maxwell's demon, published research articles, and a website on energy and entropy.

Honors
Leff is a Fellow of the American Association of Physics Teachers and a Fellow of the American Physical Society. He has been an Associate Editor and Consulting Editor for the American Journal of Physics, and was President of the American Association of Physics Teachers.

References

1937 births
Living people
21st-century American physicists
Jewish American scientists
Jewish physicists
Illinois Institute of Technology alumni
Northwestern University alumni
Scientists from Portland, Oregon
Scientists from Chicago
University of Iowa alumni
Fellows of the American Physical Society